COL2 can refer to:
 Orangeville/Laurel Aerodrome
 Type-II collagen